Sävar is a locality situated in Umeå Municipality, Västerbotten County, Sweden with 2,670 inhabitants in 2010.

It is located by E4 about 15 km north of Umeå, Sweden. Sävar is mostly known for being the last battlefield of the Finnish War.

References 

Populated places in Umeå Municipality